The Anobinae are a subfamily of moths in the family Erebidae described by Jeremy Daniel Holloway in 2005. Common morphological characteristics of Anobine moths include a dark head and prothoracic collar, lighter color on the thorax, and either bipectinate antennae or antennae with flagellomeral setae in males.

Genera
 Anoba – type genus
 Baniana
 Deinopa 
 Lephana
 Marcipa
 Plecoptera
 Rema

References

 
Moth subfamilies